Habersham County Airport  is a county-owned public-use airport located two nautical miles (3.7 km) southwest of the central business district of Cornelia, in Habersham County, Georgia, United States.

Although most U.S. airports use the same three-letter location identifier for the FAA and IATA, this airport is assigned AJR by the FAA but has no designation from the IATA.

Facilities and aircraft 
It has one asphalt paved runway designated 6/24 which measures 5,506 by 100 feet (1,678 x 30 m).

For the 12-month period ending May 26, 2009, the airport had 16,000 aircraft operations, an average of 43 per day, all of which were general aviation. At that time there were 61 aircraft based at this airport: 88.5% single-engine, 9.8% multi-engine and 1.6% helicopter.

References

External links 
 
 

Airports in Georgia (U.S. state)
Buildings and structures in Habersham County, Georgia
Transportation in Habersham County, Georgia